Elizabeth Anna Becker-Pinkston (later Campbell; March 6, 1903 – April 6, 1989) was an American diver who competed in the 1924 Summer Olympics and in the 1928 Summer Olympics. She was born in Philadelphia and died in Detroit, Michigan.

In 1916, when she was 13 years old, she was recognized as a promising future swimming champion.

In 1924 she won the gold medal in the 3 metre springboard event as well as the silver medal in the 10 metre platform competition. Four years later she won the gold medal in the 10 metre platform event.

See also
 List of members of the International Swimming Hall of Fame

References

External links
 

1903 births
1989 deaths
American female divers
Divers at the 1924 Summer Olympics
Divers at the 1928 Summer Olympics
Olympic gold medalists for the United States in diving
Olympic silver medalists for the United States in diving
Sportspeople from Philadelphia
Medalists at the 1928 Summer Olympics
Medalists at the 1924 Summer Olympics
20th-century American women
20th-century American people